The Indiana Hoosiers men's soccer team represents Indiana University Bloomington. The team is a member of the Big Ten Conference of the National Collegiate Athletic Association.

By any number of indicators, the Hoosiers are the most successful collegiate soccer program in the history of the sport. The Hoosiers have won eight national championships in men's soccer (1982, 1983, 1988, 1998, 1999, 2003, 2004 and 2012), second only to St. Louis' 10. Since the program began in 1973, Indiana has more national championships, wins, College Cup appearances, and a higher winning percentage in both regular season and post-season play than any other school in Division I soccer.

The Hoosiers have also dominated conference play. Since the Big Ten began sponsoring men's soccer in 1991, Indiana has won 13 Big Ten tournament titles. Indiana has also been crowned regular season champion 15 times, including nine-straight seasons from 1996 to 2004. A league-record 12 Big Ten Players of the Year come from Indiana.

Indiana players have won six Hermann Trophies (including Ken Snow twice) and three Missouri Athletic Club Player of the Year awards. The Hoosiers have produced 13 United States men's national soccer team players, six Olympians and six World Cup players. In addition, Hoosier players have earned All-America honors 52 times.

Every year since the NCAA began tracking men's soccer attendance in 2001, the Indiana program has ranked among the highest in average or total attendance. Indiana led the nation in average attendance in 2004 and 2005 and in total attendance in 2003.

History

Club sport beginnings
Indiana's first soccer coach was Jerry Yeagley, who went to Indiana as a Physical Education instructor and men's soccer coach. The team had been a club sport since 1947, but Yeagley's goal was to develop it into a varsity program. With the help of Jeff Richardson and Nick Matavuli, the club team was given varsity status. For ten years, with no money from the University for Yeagley's salary, team travel expenses, recruiting or uniforms, Yeagley, his wife Marilyn and the players lined the field, hung signs on campus and washed the players' uniforms. By 1973 the program had gained varsity status.

Jerry Yeagley era (1973–2003)
Once the program gained varsity status and the full support of the university in 1973, Yeagley's teams quickly became a national power. Indiana reached the NCAA final in just its fourth season as a varsity program in 1976. In fact, through his 31-year career, Yeagley took every one of his four-year players to the NCAA College Cup, soccer's version of the Final Four. His teams made 28 NCAA tournament appearances, 16 appearances in the College Cup, and 12 appearances in the national final, while winning 10 Big Ten championships and 6 National championships (1982, 1983, 1988, 1998, 1999, 2003)

The consistency the Indiana program maintained under Yeagley's tutelage was unmatched. From 1973 through 2003 no team won more NCAA Championships or appeared in more College Cups than Indiana. The Hoosiers' longest stint away from the national semifinal was three years (1985–87) and they followed that brief drought by winning the 1988 NCAA crown. Yeagley led the Hoosiers to 28 NCAA Tournament berths, the third-most in NCAA history, including one in each of his final 17 seasons. His Hoosier teams owned a 68–22 (.756) record in tournament play, the best winning percentage of any school.

The Hoosiers were also successful in the Big Ten under Yeagley. Since the Big Ten began sponsoring men's soccer in 1991, he guided Indiana to 10 Big Ten (Tournament) championships. Yeagley was instrumental in the development of a conference tournament. In addition, his Hoosiers finished at the top of the regular season standings in his final eight seasons. Yeagley led Indiana to a 68-game unbeaten streak against Big Ten foes from 1983 to 1991. His teams owned a 137–7–6 (.933) record against Big Ten opponents. Since the advent of the conference season, Yeagley led Indiana to a 62–4–3 (.920) mark in Big Ten regular season play.

Yeagley's teams are scattered throughout the NCAA record books. On four occasions, Indiana won a school-record 23 games in a season (1978, 1994, 1997, 1998). The 23 wins rank third all-time for wins in a season. In 1979, Indiana went 19–2–2 and posted the second-lowest GAA in NCAA history (0.25), as the Hoosiers blanked an NCAA record 78.3 percent (18 shutouts) of their opponents. During the 1983 and 1984 seasons, Yeagley's Indiana teams set an NCAA record by going unbeaten in 46 consecutive games. The Hoosiers posted a 40–0–6 mark during that time frame. From October 1996 until September 1999, Yeagley and his Hoosiers did not lose at home, compiling 27 consecutive wins, the third-best mark in NCAA history. From October 1995 until the 2000 Big Ten Championships, the squad went unbeaten in 38 (36–0–2) straight games against conference foes, the second longest conference unbeaten streak in NCAA history.

Hoosier players earned All-America status 49 times in the program's 31 varsity seasons, including 21 first team honorees. He led an NCAA record five Hermann Trophy winners and three Missouri Athletic Club Players of the Year. More than 20 players went on to play for the national team in their respective countries, while six played in the Olympics and six competed in the FIFA World Cup.

Yeagley's career came to a fitting and magical end in 2003 as his Hoosiers went unbeaten over their final 18 games en route to winning the NCAA Championship. The title was the sixth for the program under Yeagley and in the process, he became the all-time winningest coach in collegiate soccer history with 544 wins.

Mike Freitag era (2004–2009)

After leading the Hoosiers for 31 years, Yeagley retired after the 2003 season and was replaced by longtime assistant and former Hoosier All-American Mike Freitag. He was an assistant to Yeagley for 11 seasons before taking over the head job. Freitag added the program's seventh national title in his inaugural year in 2004, when they beat UC Santa Barbara after a penalty shootout. It marked the third occasion in which Indiana had won back-to-back national titles and it was the program's record 17th appearance in the College Cup. Following the 2009 season, Freitag's contract was not renewed.

Todd Yeagley era (2010–present)

Todd Yeagley, Jerry Yeagley's son, took over the program in 2010. In his first season Indiana captured its first Big Ten regular season title since 2007. That year, and the following season, the Hoosiers advanced to the third round of the NCAA tournament.

In 2012, Yeagley's third season as head coach, the Hoosiers advanced to a record-setting 18th College Cup, and were the first No. 16 seed to advance to the title game since the NCAA expanded its seeding to 16 teams in 2003. The Hoosiers won the 2012 national championship, the school's eighth national title and the first championship for head coach Todd Yeagley. The win made Todd and his father Jerry the first father-son duo to win college soccer championships.

In 2013, Indiana endured a rough regular season and first losing season in program history. However, with 3 wins in the Big Ten Tournament they won their first title since 2006 to earn the Big Ten automatic bid and advance to their 27th straight NCAA Tournament.
IU lost to Akron 3–2 in opening round of NCAA Tournament.

Yeagley picked up his 100th career win as a head coach on October 3, 2017, when the #1 ranked Hoosiers defeated the Evansville Purple Aces 4–0. The win brought the Hoosiers record to 9–0–2. Yeagley also coached the Hoosiers to an undefeated record, in which they went 13–0–4.

Players

Current roster

Notable alumni

 Joris Ahlinvi (2019)
 Eric Alexander (2006–2009)
 Kevin Alston (2006–2008)
 Michael Anhaeuser (1988–1991)
 Rich Balchan (2007–2010)
 Richard Ballard (2012–2016)
 Armando Betancourt (1979–1981)
 Will Bruin (2008–2010)
 Rece Buckmaster (2015–2018)
 Jacob Bushue (2010–2013)
 Mike Clark (1991–1994)
 Angelo DiBernardo (1976–1978)
 Patrick Doody (2011–2014)
 Griffin Dorsey (2017–2018)
 Mike Freitag (1976–1979)
 Nick Garcia (1998–1999)
 Ned Grabavoy (2001–2003)
 Jeremiah Gutjahr (2015–2018)
 Andrew Gutman (2015–2018)
 Femi Hollinger-Janzen (2012–2015)
 Chris Klein (1994–1997)
 Dema Kovalenko (1996–1998)
 Grant Lillard (2014–2017)
 Brian Maisonneuve (1991–1994)
 Jack Maher (2018–2019)
 Dylan Mares (2013)
 Timmy Mehl (2015–2018)
 Tommy Meyer (2008–2011)
 Drew Moor (2003–2004)
 Aidan Morris (2019)
 Trey Muse (2017–2018)
 Lee Nguyen (2004–2005)
 Jay Nolly (2000–2004)
 Pat Noonan (1999–2002)
 Danny O'Rourke (2001–2004)
 Austin Panchot (2015–2018)
 Joshua Penn (2019)
 Jacob Peterson (2003–2005)
 Caleb Porter (1994–1997)
 Justin Rennicks (2017–2018)
 Brad Ring (2005–2008)
 Ken Snow (1987–1990)
 Juergen Sommer (1987–1990)
 Gregg Thompson (1979–1982)
 Tanner Thompson (2013–2016)
 Tommy Thompson (2013)
 Mason Toye (2017)
 Todd Yeagley (1991–1994)
 Eriq Zavaleta (2011–2012)

Active professionals in bold

Current coaching staff

Coaching history
 Jerry Yeagley (1973–2003)
 Mike Freitag (2004–2009)
 Todd Yeagley (2010–present)

Yearly records

Honors 
 NCAA Men's Division I Soccer Championship:
 Winners (8): 1982, 1983, 1988, 1998, 1999, 2003, 2004, 2012
 Runners-up (9): 1976, 1978, 1980, 1984, 1994, 2001, 2017, 2020, 2022
 Big Ten Conference Tournament:
 Winners (15): 1991, 1992, 1994, 1995, 1996, 1997, 1998, 1999, 2001, 2003, 2006, 2013, 2018, 2019, 2020
 Runners-up (7): 2005, 2007, 2008, 2014, 2017, 2021, 2022
 Big Ten Conference Regular Season:
 Winners (17): 1993, 1994, 1996, 1997, 1998, 1999, 2000, 2001, 2002, 2003, 2004, 2006, 2007, 2010, 2018, 2019, 2020
 Runners-up (6): 1991, 1992, 2005, 2015, 2016, 2017

References

External links

 

 
1973 establishments in Indiana
Association football clubs established in 1973